Ravna Gora is a village in western Croatia, located between Delnice and Vrbovsko in the mountainous region of Gorski Kotar. It is the seat of a municipality whose total population is 2,430 (census 2011), with 1,709 in Ravna Gora itself and the rest in five smaller villages.

References

Populated places in Primorje-Gorski Kotar County
Municipalities of Croatia